Muhlenbergia mexicana,  known by the common names Mexican muhly and wirestem muhly, is a species of grass. It is native to North America, including most of the United States and southern Canada. It actually does not occur in Mexico.

Habitat
Muhlenbergia mexicana is known mainly from moist and wet habitat, such as meadows, wetlands, seeps, and drainage ditches.

Description
Muhlenbergia mexicana is a rhizomatous perennial herb growing 30 to 70 centimeters tall. The inflorescence is a narrow series of short, appressed to upright branches lined densely in small, pointed spikelets each a few millimeters long.

References

External links
 
 

mexicana
Grasses of North America